Chu An-min (born 1957) is a South Korean-born Taiwanese writer and publisher.

Chu's father was a traditional Chinese medicine practitioner from Yantai who fled the Chinese Civil War. Though he intended to settle in Taiwan, the elder Chu was unable to secure safe passage on a ship across the Taiwan Strait and moved to South Korea instead. Chu An-min was born in South Korea in 1957. As a child, Chu was read classics such as the Analects and Zuo Zhuan in lieu of other forms of entertainment such as playing outside or with toys. The literary foundation his father built for Chu connected him to Chinese culture. Chu An-min moved to Taiwan in 1977, and earned a bachelor of arts degree in Chinese literature from National Cheng Kung University. He taught for one year at Mingdao High School, then resigned to pursue a career in literature. As chief editor of Unitas, Chu received the literature editing award at the 2003 May Fourth Literary Prize ceremony, funded by the Wenhsun literary magazine. After two decades at Unitas, Chu founded the Ink Literary Monthly Publishing Company. While running Ink Publishing, Chu was named the 2021 recipient of the Golden Tripod special contributions award.

References

1957 births
Living people
South Korean emigrants to Taiwan
National Cheng Kung University alumni
Taiwanese publishers (people)
20th-century Taiwanese educators
Taiwanese schoolteachers
Taiwanese male writers
20th-century Taiwanese writers
21st-century Taiwanese writers
Taiwanese company founders